Leucophlebia is a genus of moths in the family Sphingidae first described by John O. Westwood in 1847.

Species
The genus includes the following species:

 Leucophlebia afra Karsch, 1891
 Leucophlebia caecilie Eitschberger, 2003
 Leucophlebia edentata Rothschild & Jordan, 1916
 Leucophlebia emittens Walker, 1866
 Leucophlebia formosana Clark, 1936
 Leucophlebia frederkingi Eitschberger, 2003
 Leucophlebia hogenesi Eitschberger, 2003
 Leucophlebia lineata Westwood, 1847
 Leucophlebia muehlei Eitschberger, 2003
 Leucophlebia neumanni Rothschild, 1902
 Leucophlebia paul Eitschberger, 2003
 Leucophlebia pinratanai Eitschberger, 2003
 Leucophlebia rosacea Butler, 1875
 Leucophlebia schachti Eitschberger, 2003
 Leucophlebia vietnamensis Eitschberger, 2003
 Leucophlebia xanthopis Hampson, 1910

References

 
Smerinthini
Moth genera
Taxa named by John O. Westwood